Unicredito was an Italian holding company, formed by the owner of banks: the banking foundations of Cassa di Risparmio di Verona, Vicenza, Belluno e Ancona (Cariverona Banca) and Cassa di Risparmio della Marca Trivigiana (Cassamarca), in a ratio of 83.5% versus 16.5%. In 1997 the banking foundation of Cassa di Risparmio di Torino (Banca CRT) joined the group. The group merged with Credito Italiano to form Unicredito Italiano in 1998.

Subsidiaries
 Cassa di Risparmio di Verona, Vicenza, Belluno e Ancona (Cariverona Banca)
 Cassa di Risparmio della Marca Trivigiana (Cassamarca)
 Cassa di Risparmio di Torino (Banca CRT)

Equity investments
 Cassa di Risparmio di Trieste
 Cassa di Risparmio di Bra
 Cassa di Risparmio di Fossano
 Cassa di Risparmio di Saluzzo
 Banca Cassa di Risparmio di Savigliano

Other acquisition
 Monte di Credito su Pegno di Vicenza (1996)

Shareholders
 Fondazione Cariverona
 Fondazione Cassamarca
 Fondazione CRT
 Fondazione Caritrieste

References

 *
Holding companies established in 1994
Banks disestablished in 1998
Holding companies disestablished in 1998
Holding companies of Italy
Defunct banks of Italy
Italian companies established in 1994
Banks established in 1994
Italian companies disestablished in 1998